The 4th constituency of the Alpes Maritimes is a French legislative constituency in the Alpes Maritimes département. Like the other 576 French constituencies, it elects one MP using the two-round system, with a run-off if no candidate receives over 50% of the vote in the first round.

Geography 
It covers a large area in the east of the department, from Nice to the Italian border at Menton.

Historic Representation

Election results

2022

2017

2012

|- style="background-color:#E9E9E9;text-align:center;"
! colspan="2" rowspan="2" style="text-align:left;" | Candidate
! rowspan="2" colspan="2" style="text-align:left;" | Party
! colspan="2" | 1st round
! colspan="2" | 2nd round
|- style="background-color:#E9E9E9;text-align:center;"
! width="75" | Votes
! width="30" | %
! width="75" | Votes
! width="30" | %
|-
| style="background-color:" |
| style="text-align:left;" | Jean-Claude Guibal
| style="text-align:left;" | Union for a Popular Movement
| UMP
| 
| 32.70%
| 
| 55.22%
|-
| style="background-color:" |
| style="text-align:left;" | Lydia Schenardi
| style="text-align:left;" | National Front
| FN
| 
| 22.90%
| 
| 44.78%
|-
| style="background-color:" |
| style="text-align:left;" | Pascale Gerard
| style="text-align:left;" | Socialist Party
| PS
| 
| 19.79%
| colspan="2" style="text-align:left;" |
|-
| style="background-color:" |
| style="text-align:left;" | Francis Tujague
| style="text-align:left;" | Left Front
| FG
| 
| 10.18%
| colspan="2" style="text-align:left;" |
|-
| style="background-color:" |
| style="text-align:left;" | Stéphane Cherki
| style="text-align:left;" | Miscellaneous Right
| DVD
| 
| 9.63%
| colspan="2" style="text-align:left;" |
|-
| style="background-color:" |
| style="text-align:left;" | Thierry Giorgio
| style="text-align:left;" | Miscellaneous Right
| DVD
| 
| 1.48%
| colspan="2" style="text-align:left;" |
|-
| style="background-color:" |
| style="text-align:left;" | Jean Philippe Secordel-Martin
| style="text-align:left;" | Ecologist
| ECO
| 
| 1.26%
| colspan="2" style="text-align:left;" |
|-
| style="background-color:" |
| style="text-align:left;" | Lucien Bella
| style="text-align:left;" | Ecologist
| ECO
| 
| 1.05%
| colspan="2" style="text-align:left;" |
|-
| style="background-color:" |
| style="text-align:left;" | Nicolas Zahar
| style="text-align:left;" | Miscellaneous Right
| DVD
| 
| 0.75%
| colspan="2" style="text-align:left;" |
|-
| style="background-color:" |
| style="text-align:left;" | Joseph Markiel
| style="text-align:left;" | Far Left
| EXG
| 
| 0.26%
| colspan="2" style="text-align:left;" |
|-
| colspan="8" style="background-color:#E9E9E9;"|
|- style="font-weight:bold"
| colspan="4" style="text-align:left;" | Total
| 
| 100%
| 
| 100%
|-
| colspan="8" style="background-color:#E9E9E9;"|
|-
| colspan="4" style="text-align:left;" | Registered voters
| 
| style="background-color:#E9E9E9;"|
| 
| style="background-color:#E9E9E9;"|
|-
| colspan="4" style="text-align:left;" | Blank/Void ballots
| 
| 0.79%
| 
| 6.06%
|-
| colspan="4" style="text-align:left;" | Turnout
| 
| 57.58%
| 
| 49.72%
|-
| colspan="4" style="text-align:left;" | Abstentions
| 
| 42.42%
| 
| 50.28%
|-
| colspan="8" style="background-color:#E9E9E9;"|
|- style="font-weight:bold"
| colspan="6" style="text-align:left;" | Result
| colspan="2" style="background-color:" | | UMP HOLD
|}

2007

2002

 
 
 
 
 
 
|-
| colspan="8" bgcolor="#E9E9E9"|
|-

1997

 
 
 
 
 
 
|-
| colspan="8" bgcolor="#E9E9E9"|
|-
 
 

 
 
 
 
 

*RPR dissident

Sources

Results at the Ministry of the Interior (French)

4